Pseudonesticus is a genus of spiders in the family Nesticidae. It was first described in 2013 by Liu & Li. , it contains 6 species, all from China.

Species
Pseudonesticus comprises the following species:
Pseudonesticus clavatus Liu & Li, 2013
Pseudonesticus dafangensis Lin, Ballarin & Li, 2016
Pseudonesticus miao Lin, Ballarin & Li, 2016
Pseudonesticus spinosus Lin, Ballarin & Li, 2016
Pseudonesticus wumengensis Lin, Ballarin & Li, 2016
Pseudonesticus ziyunensis Lin, Ballarin & Li, 2016

References

Nesticidae
Araneomorphae genera
Spiders of China